Pier Paolo Brega Massone was the chief thoracic consultant at the Santa Rita medical clinic in Milan, Italy. In October 2010 he was sentenced to fifteen and a half years in prison for performing unnecessary operations on patients in order to claim payment for them from the Italian state. Seven other doctors at the same clinic were also found guilty at trial.

The judge described Brega Massone as "cruel, malevolent and lacking the slightest sense of human pity". Brega Massone in turn has stated that he is "just the scapegoat" and will appeal.

On 9 April 2014, Brega Massone, tried for 4 murders and 34 battery cases in a different trial, has been convicted to life sentence.
In the second instance (19 october 2018), the sentence was reduced to 15 years of prison for homicide beyond intent.

See also
List of serial killers by country

References

Italian people convicted of murder
Italian serial killers
Living people
Male serial killers
Medical serial killers
People convicted of battery
Year of birth missing (living people)